Katagiri is a Japanese surname. Notable people with the surname include:

, Japanese footballer
, Japanese Zen Buddhist
, Japanese comedian, actor, sculptor and potter
, Japanese daimyō
Michiko Katagiri, Japanese Paralympic swimmer
, Japanese alpine skier
Mineo Katagiri (1919-2005), Japanese minister and activist
, Japanese alpine skier
, Imperial Japanese Army general
, Brazilian Politician

Fictional characters
, a character in the anime series Mobile Suit Gundam 00
, a character in the manga series Pani Poni
, a character in the anime series AKB0048
, a character in the visual novel Akaneiro ni Somaru Saka
, the main protagonist of the manga series Tomodachi Game

See also
Katagiri Dam, a dam in Nagano Prefecture, Japan

Japanese-language surnames